Hsi-Jui Shen (May 8, 1905 in Shanghai, China – February 24, 1996 in San Jose, California, United States) was the former head of the central bank of China, and chief manager for the banking conglomerate HSBC (appointed in 1964). Shen was also among the first students of Chinese descent at Dartmouth College (class of 1927) and Tuck School of Business (class of 1928). He had four children; David Shen, Dora Hsia, Douglas Shen, and Frank Shen.

References

Bibliography
Solinger, D. (1991). From Lathes to Looms: China's Industrial Policy in Comparative Perspective: 1978-1992: Stanford University Press.

External links
Sunzil.lib.hku.hk
Arts.gla.ac.uk

1905 births
1996 deaths
Chinese bankers
Tuck School of Business alumni
Businesspeople from Shanghai
Chinese expatriates in the United States
HSBC